Tropheops tropheops is a species of cichlid endemic to Lake Malawi preferring areas with rocky substrates.  This species can reach a length of  TL.  It can also be found in the aquarium trade.

References

External links
 Photograph

tropheops
Fish of Lake Malawi
Cichlid fish of Africa
Fish described in 1922
Taxa named by Charles Tate Regan
Taxonomy articles created by Polbot